Uetikon am See is a municipality in the district of Meilen in the canton of Zürich in Switzerland.

History

Uetikon am See is first mentioned in 1150 as Uotinchova.  Until 1924 it was known as Uetikon.

Geography
Of this area, 47.1% is used for agricultural purposes, while 16.9% is forested. The rest of the land, (36%) is settled.   housing and buildings made up 28.9% of the total area, while transportation infrastructure made up the rest (6.9%).    41.3% of the total municipal area was undergoing some type of construction.

It is located on the north bank of the Lake Zürich in the Pfannenstiel region.  Uetikon is located about halfway between Zürich and Rapperswil. In the local dialect it is called Üetike.

The municipality includes the two sections of Uetikon known as Kleindorf and Grossdorf as well as the old settlements of Langenbaum, Oberstmatt, Grüt, Rundirain and Weid. Uetikon is home to a chemical factory of the same name. Except for the chemical plant, the harbour and the train station, most of the municipality is located a bit uphill from the lake.

Demographics
, 14.9% of the population was made up of foreign nationals.   the gender distribution of the population was 48.4% male and 51.6% female. Over the last 10 years the population has grown at a rate of 29.8%. Most of the population speaks German  (89.1%), with Italian being second most common (2.7%) and Albanian being third (1.4%).

In the 2007 election the most popular party was the SVP which received 35.7% of the vote.  The next three most popular parties were the FDP (19.2%), the SPS (16.6%) and the CSP (10.1%).

The age distribution of the population is children and teenagers (0–19 years old) make up 22.2% of the population, while adults (20–64 years old) make up 61% and seniors (over 64 years old) make up 16.9%.  In Uetikon am See about 81.5% of the population (between age 25-64) have completed either non-mandatory upper secondary education or additional higher education (either university or a Fachhochschule).  There are 2113 households in Uetikon am See.

Uetikon am See has an unemployment rate of 1.48%.  , there were 61 people employed in the primary economic sector and about 17 businesses involved in this sector.  415 people are employed in the secondary sector and there are 47 businesses in this sector.  950 people are employed in the tertiary sector, with 153 businesses in this sector.   43.3% of the working population were employed full-time, and 56.7% were employed part-time.

 there were 1554 Catholics and 2466 Protestants in Uetikon am See. In the 2000 census, religion was broken down into several smaller categories. Of the rest of the population, 0% were Muslim, 4.4% belonged to another religion (not listed), 2.7% did not give a religion, and 13.6% were atheist or agnostic.

Transportation 
Uetikon railway station is a terminal station of the S6 line of the Zürich S-Bahn, and is also serviced by the S7 (every 30 minutes) and SN7 (night) lines.

The 931 and 932 local bus lines carry commuters to and from the train station, while the 920 and 925 bus lines provide service to and from Meilen and Stäfa.

In the summer there are regular boats along the lake to Zurich and Rapperswil, run by the Zürichsee-Schifffahrtsgesellschaft (ZSG).

References

External links 

Official Page (German)
Chemie Uetikon

Municipalities of the canton of Zürich
Populated places on Lake Zurich